The list of ship decommissionings in 1874 includes a chronological list of all ships decommissioned in 1874.


References

See also 

1874
 Ship decommissionings